Browns is an unincorporated community in Boone County, in the U.S. state of Missouri. It is located northeast of Columbia on Paris Road (Route B). Browns was once a stop on the Columbia Terminal Railroad.

History
A variant name was "Brown's Station". The community was named after Leonidas B. Brown, a local medical doctor. A post office called Browns Station was established in 1875, and remained in operation until 1957.

References

Unincorporated communities in Boone County, Missouri
Unincorporated communities in Missouri